Nereo Fossati (born 29 March 1937) is an Italian sprinter. He competed in the men's 4 × 400 metres relay at the 1960 Summer Olympics.

References

External links
 

1937 births
Living people
Athletes (track and field) at the 1960 Summer Olympics
Italian male sprinters
Olympic athletes of Italy
Place of birth missing (living people)
Universiade medalists in athletics (track and field)
Universiade silver medalists for Italy